Qala-e Mafushad is the easternmost village in Afghanistan, near the Chinese border. It is a  Kyrgyz settlement in the Little Pamir, east of  Lake Chaqmaqtin, in the Wakhan. Due to its favourable geographic location, it has been proposed as a terminus of a future rail corridor (Corridor 6) of the Afghanistan National Railway Plan, which would allow goods to be transferred through it to Xinjiang.

References

Populated places in Badakhshan Province
Wakhan